Salve-se Quem Puder (English title: Run For Your Lives) is a Brazilian telenovela produced and broadcast by TV Globo. It premiered on 27 January 2020, replacing Bom Sucesso, and ended on 16 July 2021. The series is written by Daniel Ortiz, with the collaboration of Flávia Bessone, Nilton Braga, Pedro Neschling, Gabriela Miranda, Bruno Segadilha and Victor Atherino.

It stars Deborah Secco, Juliana Paiva and Vitória Strada as three women who have to enter the Witness Protection Program after witnessing a homicide. João Baldasserini, Felipe Simas, Thiago Fragoso, Rafael Cardoso, Bruno Ferrari, Dandara Mariana, Aline Dias and Juliana Alves also star in main roles.

Plot 
Alexia (Deborah Secco), Luna (Juliana Paiva) and Kyra (Vitória Strada) are three women who meet in Cancún and witness the murder of a powerful judge. They enter the Witness Protection Program and get sent to São Paulo, changing their names to Josimara, Fiona and Cleyde. They are presumed dead to protect them from the killers. Dominique (Guilhermina Guinle) is a dangerous woman who ordered the judge to be killed and is also the aunt of Renzo (Rafael Cardoso), who had a romance in with Alexia in Mexico. Alexia is an unsuccessful actress who had just received her first starring role in a telenovela. Alexia was always ignored by her mother (Débora Olivieri), who never hid her favoritism for her younger daughter, Petra (Bruna Guerin), an ambitious woman who wants to win over her rich and widowed cousin Alan (Thiago Fragoso). Luna and her father, Mário (Murilo Rosa), were abandoned by her mother, Helena (Flávia Alessandra), in Mexico when she was four years old. Helena crossed the border to the United States, promising to earn money and never returned. Kyra was about to marry Rafael.

Alexia, Luna and Kyra are convinced to use their new identities to infiltrate in their real lives. Alexia gets a job as Rafael's secretary in order to keep him away from his ex, Renatinha (Juliana Alves), who takes advantage of Kyra's fake death to get him back. Kyra works as a nanny for Alan so that Ignário (Otávio Augusto), Alexia's grandfather who has Alzheimer's disease, does not forget about his granddaughter. Luna infiltrates the life of her mother, who married a millionaire and is now a powerful businesswoman. Luna works as her assistant and will try to find out why she abandoned her.

Series overview

Cast 
 Deborah Secco as Alexia Máximo / Josimara dos Santos
 Juliana Paiva as Luna Furtado / Fiona Matteucchi
 Vitória Strada as Kyra Romantini / Cleyde Ferreira
 João Baldasserini as José Prazeroso "Zezinho"
 Felipe Simas as Téo Santamarina
 Thiago Fragoso as Alan Máximo
 Rafael Cardoso as Renzo Machado de Alencar
 José Condessa as Juan de La Piedra
 Bruno Ferrari as Rafael Guimarães
 Dandara Mariana as Maribel "Bel" Apolinário
 Aline Dias as Úrsula Ferraz
 Juliana Alves as Renata "Renatinha" Modesto
 Guilhermina Guinle as Dominique Machado de Alencar
 Flávia Alessandra as Helena Furtado Santamarina
 Leopoldo Pacheco as Hugo Santamarina
 Grace Gianoukas as Ermelinda "Ermê" Prazeroso
 Murilo Rosa as Mário Furtado
 Daniel Rangel as Tarantino Máximo
 Valentina Bulc as Beatriz "Bia" Romantini
 Lívia Inhudes as Thammy
 Bruna Guerin as Petra Máximo
 Débora Olivieri as Graziela Máximo
 Carolina Kasting as Agnes Romantini
 Sabrina Petraglia as Micaela Santamarina
 Marcos Pitombo as Bruno Freitas
 Cirillo Luna as Gael Freitas
 Marianna Armellini as Verônica and Marlene Andrade
 Nina Frosi as Gabriela "Gabi" Gonzáles
 Ricardo Duque as Detective Ivo Mantovani
 Otávio Augusto as Ignácio Máximo
 Cosme dos Santos as Edgard Apolinário
 Cristina Pereira as Lúcia
 Marilu Bueno as Dulce Sampaio
 Conrado Caputto as Coach Isaac
 Bernardo de Assis as Catatau / Lucy
 Giordano Becheleni as Enéas
 Cláudio Olegário as Erick
 Andressa Robles as Carol
 Bárbara Sut as Dionice
 Prazeres Barbosa as Marieta
 Gil Hernandez as Pancho
 Jerônimo Martins as Eduardo
 Daniel Satti as Donato Camargo
 Igor Cosso as Antônio Romantini Júnior
 Mila Carmo as Vicky
 Amauri Reis as Baggio
 Ygor Marçal as Nico Máximo "Mosquito"
 Alice Palmar as Sandra Máximo "Queen"

Guest cast 
 Aílton Graça as Judge Vitório Albuquerque
 Jacqueline Laurence as Gracita Romantini
 Ana Carbatti as Consul Adriana Regiano
 Zezé Motta as Neusa Ferraz
 Déo Garcez as Dr. Emir
 Luka Ribeiro as Telenovela director
 Werles Pajero as Robson
 Cláudio Galvan as Taxi driver
 Maria Flor Secco Moura as Alexia / Jú
 Sophia de Carvalho as Child Luna
 Marina Loggia as Child Kyra
 Christina Rodrigues as Cidinha
 Patricia Pillar as herself
 Thiago Lacerda as himself
 Betty Faria as herself
 Ary Fontoura as himself
 Marcelo & Ryan as Themselves
 Sophia Abrahão as herself and as Júlia Santamarina
 Carol Sampaio as herself
 Mumuzinho as himself
 Nego do Borel as himself
 Narcisa Tamborindeguy as herself
 Dudu Bertholini as himself
 Ana Botafogo as herself 
 Rodrigo Simas as Alejandro Garcia Morales
 Fátima Bernardes as herself
 Lília Cabral as herself
 Francisco Cuoco as himself
 Maria Eduarda de Carvalho as herself
 Marcello Melo Jr. as himself
 Bruno Dubeux as Luciano
 Patrícia Poeta as herself
 Babu Santana as Nanico

Production 
Daniel Ortiz began writing the synopsis for the telenovela in November 2017. The synopsis was approved in April 2018 and joined the queue of 7pm telenovelas, to premiere in early 2020. In September 2018, Daniel had already delivered 6 full episodes and revealed the first details about the story. The telenovela was originally titled Adrenalina but was later changed to Salve-se Quem Puder. Filming began in Cancún on 25 October 2019. On 16 March 2020, it was announced that filming of the telenovela was suspended due to the COVID-19 pandemic, because of this, the telenovela's broadcast will be interrupted after 28 March 2020. Reruns of previous telenovelas currently occupy its timeslot. Filming resumed on 10 August 2020, under strict criteria, to comply with safety guidelines. Scripts were rewritten so that only two actors participate in each filmed scene. The new episodes began airing on 17 May 2021.

Soundtrack

Volume 1 

Salve-se Quem Puder Vol. 1 is the first soundtrack of the telenovela, released on 3 April 2020 by Som Livre.

Ratings

References

External links 
 

2020 telenovelas
TV Globo telenovelas
Brazilian telenovelas
2020 Brazilian television series debuts
2020s Brazilian television series
2021 Brazilian television series endings
Brazilian LGBT-related television shows
Transgender-related television shows
Television shows set in São Paulo
Portuguese-language telenovelas
Television productions suspended due to the COVID-19 pandemic
Television series about witness protection